The 2013–14 National Premier League (also known as the 2013–14 Red Stripe Premier League) is the highest competitive football league in Jamaica. It is the 40th edition of the competition. The season will begin in September 15 and will be completed in May 2014.  The teams will play each other 3 times each then the top eight teams will enter a knock-out playoff to decide the campions. Harbour View were the defending champions, having won their fourth Jamaican championship last season.

Teams 
Rivoli United and August Town FC were promoted following the RSPL Promotion playoffs.  Reno FC and Savannah FC both from Westmoreland were relegated at the end of the 2012–2013 season.

League table

Semifinals

First legs

Second legs

Montego Bay United wins series 3–2 on aggregate

Waterhouse wins series 5–4 on aggregate

Finals

Top goalscorers

Individual awards

Monthly awards

Promotion from Super Leagues
The winners of the 4 regional Super Leagues play-off in a home and home round robin series.
KSAFA Super League - TBD
South Central Confederation Super League - TBD
Eastern Confederation Super League - TBD
Western Confederation Super League - TBD

References

External links 
 

National Premier League seasons
1
Jam